Sacred Heart School is a Catholic primary school in , Tasmania, Australia.

History 

Sacred Heart College, Launceston, was established in 1872 by the Presentation Sisters. It was co-educational to Grade Two, then girls only to Grade 12. For some years a small number of boarders were taken in by the Sisters. For some years the Sisters taught both girls and boys, including secondary education. Then for some time a gentleman ran the section for young men using the southern end of the buildings. It was not until 1919 that the Christian Brothers came to Launceston to educate the boys. For many years the Sisters were able to run two schools on the site: Sacred Heart College, a fee paying establishment and a parish school, St Mary's School. In 1978, Sacred Heart College amalgamated with St Thomas More's to form Marian College, which catered for Catholic Secondary and Primary School Girls.

Marian College was located in Launceston. It catered for Catholic Secondary and Primary School Girls. It was formed from an Amalgamation of Sacred Heart College, Launceston and St Thomas More's College. The sites of Sacred Heart and St Thomas More's were the two campuses of Marian College. In 1984, Marian College’s Secondary Classes were transferred to St. Patrick’s College.
St Thomas More's and Sacred Heart then became Co-ed primary schools in 1984, Becoming St Thomas More's School and Sacred Heart School, Launceston.

See also

 List of schools in Tasmania
 Education in Tasmania
 Roman Catholic Archdiocese of Hobart
 Catholic education in Australia

References

External links
 Sacred Heart School website (Includes a history of the school)
 Entry in The Companion to Tasmanian History

Schools in Launceston, Tasmania
Catholic primary schools in Tasmania
Educational institutions established in 1872
1872 establishments in Australia